Sequestration or sequester may refer to:

Law and government
 Sequestration (law), the seizure of property for creditors or the state. See also Committee for Compounding with Delinquents
 Jury sequestration, the isolation of a jury
 Bankruptcy, in Scottish law
 Budget sequestration, U.S. legal procedure in which automatic spending cuts are triggered
 Budget sequestration in 2013, automatic spending cuts to the U.S. federal budget beginning in 2013
 A euphemism for asset forfeiture by the state

Science
 Carbon sequestration
 Biological processes in which an organism accumulates a compound or tissue:
 Bile acid sequestrant
 Pulmonary sequestration
 Pyrrolizidine alkaloid sequestration
 Chelation, bonding between a polydentate ligand and a central atom

Other uses
 Sequester (band)
 Sequestered (TV series), a Crackle television series
 Vibius Sequester, (4th or 5th century), Roman geographer
 Protective sequestration, a public health measure

See also
 Sequestrant, a food additive which improves the quality and stability of foods